Jordan participated in the 3rd West Asian Games held in Doha, Qatar from December 1, 2005 to December 10, 2005. Jordan ranked 8th with 3 gold medals and 11 silver medals in this edition of the West Asian Games.

References

West Asian Games
Nations at the 2005 West Asian Games
West Asian Games
Jordan at the West Asian Games